Pharaoh's Daughter is an American Jewish world music band from New York City. Formed in 1995 by Basya Schechter, their music is a mix of American folk, Jewish klezmer, and Middle Eastern sounds.

Schechter is currently a member of the alternative hip hop group Darshan, together with Rabbi Shir Yaakov Feit and Jewish rapper Eprhyme.

Band members 
Current
Basya Schechter — lead vocals, guitar, oud, saz, percussion
Daphna Mor — recorders, zurna, ney, melodica, vocals
Meg Okura — violin 
Shanir Ezra Blumenkranz  — bass
Yuval Lion — drums
Jason Lindner — rhodes piano, keys
Mathias Kunzli — percussion
Uri Sharlin — accordion, vocals

Former
Daniel Freedman — drums
Noah Hoffeld — cello
Alan Kashan — santur

Discography
Daddy's Pockets (Orchard, 1999)
Out of the Reeds (Knitting Factory, 2000) - rereleased on Tzadik in 2004
Exile (Knitting Factory, 2002)
Haran (OY, 2007)

References

External links
Official Website

Pharaoh's Daughter on MySpace

American folk musical groups
Musical groups established in 2005
Musical groups from New York City
Shemspeed Records artists
Tzadik Records artists
Psychedelic folk groups
Jewish folk rock groups